Batuhan Çiftçi (born 16 December 1997) is a Turkish boxer in the flyweight (-52 kg) discipline. He received a quota for the 2020 Summer Olympics.

Batuhan Çiftçi was born in Üsküdar, Istanbul, Turkey on 16 December 1997.

He started boxing in around 2008.

He competed at the 2018 Mediterranean Games in Tarragona, Spain, the 2019 AIBA World Championships in Yekaterinburg, Russia, and the 2019 European Games in Minsk, Belarus. He won the bronze medal at the 2020 European Boxing Olympic Qualification Tournament in London, United Kingdom. He obtained a quota for the 2020 Summer Olympics.

References

1997 births
Living people
People from Üsküdar
Sportspeople from Istanbul
Turkish male boxers
Flyweight boxers
Fenerbahçe boxers
Mediterranean Games gold medalists for Turkey
Competitors at the 2018 Mediterranean Games
Competitors at the 2022 Mediterranean Games
Mediterranean Games medalists in boxing
European Games competitors for Turkey
Boxers at the 2019 European Games
Boxers at the 2020 Summer Olympics
Olympic boxers of Turkey
21st-century Turkish people